Nikhil Haldipur (born 19 December 1977 in Kolkata) is an Indian first class cricketer. He is a left-handed batsman and represented West Bengal,India B, India A, Rest of India, East Zone and Goa.

In the year 1998 he won the Castrol Most Promising Cricketer Award along with Amit Pagnis (Mumbai), Mohammed Kaif (Uttar Pradesh) and Reetinder Singh Sodhi (Punjab).

 
He studied at St. Lawrence High School, Kolkata. Nikhil Haldipur never made it to the Indian National Team despite being recognized as one of the best left-handed batsmen in the country. He was written about in the article named "The unsung heroes" by SPORTSSTAR Magazine, edition dated 27 Jan. 2007

References 

I think his ancestry hails from Haldipur, near Kumta in Uttara Kannada Dist of Karnataka. A very talented player. Didn't get due recognition like so many unsung heroes.

Indian cricketers
Bengal cricketers
Goa cricketers
East Zone cricketers
Living people
1977 births